Promises is an 2021 French-Italian romantic drama film written and directed by Amanda Sthers, based on her novel of the same name. The film stars Kelly Reilly, Jean Reno, Pierfrancesco Favino, Cara Theobold, Deepak Verma, Leon Hesby and Kris Marshall.

Cast
 Kelly Reilly as Laura
 Jean Reno as Grandpa
 Pierfrancesco Favino as Alexander
 Cara Theobold as Jane
 Deepak Verma as Jack
 Kris Marshall as Louis
 Leon Hesby as Young Alexander (16)
 Ethan Hunsinger as young Alexander (10)
 Marie Mouté as Marika

Production
The film is set on Italy and London. Principal photography started in Rome on 22 March 2021 and concluded on 22 April.

References

External links
 

2021 films
French romantic drama films
Italian romantic drama films
2020s English-language films
2020s French films